The following is a timeline of the history of the city of Angers, France.

Prior to 19th century

 372 – Roman Catholic Diocese of Angers established.
 471 – Merovingians in power.
 8th century – Angers becomes part of Anjou province.
 851 – Frankish-Breton treaty signed in Angers.
 870 – Duke of Anjou centered in Angers.
 1025 – Angers Cathedral built.
 1028 –  founded.
 1059 –  rebuilt.
 12th century –  construction begins.
 1151 – Henry Plantagenet becomes count of Anjou and Maine (and king of England in 1154).
 1184 –  built.
 13th century – Château d'Angers (castle) enlarged.
 1288 – Jews expelled from Anjou.
 1364 – Universitas Andegavensis active.
 1380 – Apocalypse Tapestry created.
 1384 – Public clock installed.
 1487 -  mansion built.
 1508 - Anjou customary laws published.
 1516 -  (judicial proceeding) takes place.
 1539 –  (judicial proceeding) takes place.
 1585 – Huguenots in power.
 1589 – Catholic League active, then quashed.
 1685 -  founded.
 1790 – Angers becomes part of the Maine-et-Loire souveraineté.
 1791 –  founded.
 1793
 December: Siege of Angers.
 1796 –  established.
 1797 – Musée des Beaux-Arts d'Angers established.

19th century
 1806 – Population: 29,187.
 1839 – Basse-Chaine Bridge built.
 1849 – Cointreau distillery in business.
 1850 – 16 April: Collapse of the Basse-Chaine Bridge.
 1855 – Chamber of Commerce established.
 1856 – Population: 50,726.
 1859 – Café Serin in business.
 1869 – Patriote de l'Ouest newspaper begins publication.
 1871 –  opens.
 1873 – Journal de Maine-et-Loire newspaper begins publication.
 1875 – Catholic University of Angers active.
 1876 – Population: 56,846.
 1878 –  (rail station) opens.
 1883 –  newspaper begins publication.
 1886 – Population: 73,044.
 1889 –  opens.
 1895 – Jardin botanique de la Faculté de Pharmacie d'Angers (garden) established.
 1896 –  begins operating.

20th century

 1911 – Population: 83,786.
 1914 – Avrillé airfield begins operating.
 1919 – Angers SCO (sport club) formed.
 1937
 Parc de la Garenne created.
 Roman-era archaeological remains found.
 1940 – June: German occupation begins.
 1944
 May: Bombing by Allied forces.
 August: German occupation ends.
  newspaper begins publication.
 1964 – Angers twinned with Haarlem, Netherlands.
 1967 – 1967 Tour de France cycling race departs from Angers.
 1968 –  opens.
 1971 – University of Angers and Orchestre Philharmonique des Pays de la Loire established.
 1972 – 1972 Tour de France cycling race departs from Angers.
 1973
  (bridge) built.
 Association généalogique de l'Anjou formed.
 1974 – Angers twinned with Bamako, Mali.
 1980 – Association des musulmans d'Angers founded.
 1982
 Angers becomes part of the Pays de la Loire region.
 Ducs d'Angers ice hockey team formed.
 Angers twinned with Pisa, Italy.
 1983 –  (assembly hall) built.
 1985 –  developed.
 1986 –  established.
 1988
  begins broadcasting.
 Angers twinned with Wigan, United Kingdom.
 1991 –  assembly hall built.
 1994 –  opens.
 1999 – Population: 151,279.

21st century

 2005 –  tried.
 2007
  cultural space opens.
  television begins broadcasting.
 2011
 Angers tramway begins operating.
 City partnered with Austin, Texas, USA.
 Population: 148,803.
 2014
 March:  held.
 Christophe Béchu becomes mayor.
 Mosque construction begins.
 2015 – December:  held.

See also
 Angers history
 
  (Roman era settlement)
 
 
 List of counts of Anjou (residing in Angers beginning in 9th c.)
 
  department

other cities in the Pays de la Loire region
 Timeline of Le Mans
 Timeline of Nantes

References

This article incorporates information from the French Wikipedia.

Bibliography

in English

in French
 
  (+ table of contents)

External links

 Items related to Angers, various dates (via Europeana).
 Items related to Angers, various dates (via Digital Public Library of America).

angers
Angers
angers